May Irene Olsen (born 22 May 1956) is a Norwegian sport shooter, born in Lørenskog. She competed in women's 10 metre air rifle and 50 metre rifle three positions at the 1988 Summer Olympics in Seoul.

References

External links

1956 births
Living people
People from Lørenskog
Norwegian female sport shooters
Olympic shooters of Norway
Shooters at the 1988 Summer Olympics
Sportspeople from Viken (county)